Marek Fiurášek (born January 21, 1975) was a Czech nordic combined skier who competed in the 1990s. He finished eighth in the 4 x 5 km team event at the 1998 Winter Olympics in Nagano.

Fiurášek's best career finish was third in a World Cup B 15 km individual event in Austria in 1995.

External links
Nordic combined team Olympic results: 1988-2002 

Nordic combined skiers at the 1998 Winter Olympics
Czech male Nordic combined skiers
Living people
1975 births